Hadapsar  Assembly constituency is one of the 288 Vidhan Sabha (legislative assembly) constituencies of Maharashtra.

Geographical scope
The constituency comprises ward no. 130 of Pune Municipal Corporation (Yerwada revenue circle (Mundhva Saza) in Pune City taluka and ward nos. 17, 19 to 23, 26, 131 to 134,
137 to 139 of PMC.

Members of Legislative Assembly

References

Assembly constituencies of Pune district
Assembly constituencies of Maharashtra